Bra böckers lexikon (BBL) is a Swedish encyclopedia published between 1973 and 1996, in four editions with 25 volumes each. The first three editions sold more than 400,000 copies. The first edition was published between 1973 and 1981, the second 1974–82, the third 1983-90 and the fourth 1991–96.  Between 1995 and 1999 a special edition, Bra böckers lexikon 2000, was published.

References

External links
 Bra Böckers Lexikon — information in Swedish about the work and its Swedish editions, from Christofer Psilander's website Svenska uppslagsverk

Swedish encyclopedias
1973 non-fiction books
1974 non-fiction books
1983 non-fiction books
1991 non-fiction books
20th-century encyclopedias